Mass media are the means through which information is transmitted to a large audience. This includes newspapers, television, radio, and more recently the Internet. Organizations that provide news through mass media in the United States are collectively known as the news media in the United States.

History

Structure

Public sector news media
The Public Broadcasting Service (PBS) is the primary non-profit television service, with 349 member public broadcasters. News and public affairs programs include PBS NewsHour, Frontline, and Washington Week. In September 2012, PBS rated 88% above CNN in public affairs programming, placing it competitively with cable news outlets but far behind private broadcasters ABC, CBS, and NBC. Due to its local and non-profit nature, PBS does not produce 24-hour news, but some member stations carry MHz WorldView, NHK World, or World as a digital subchannel.

National Public Radio (NPR) is the primary non-profit radio service, offered by over 900 stations. Its news programming includes All Things Considered and Morning Edition.

PBS and NPR are funded primarily by member contributions and corporate underwriters, with a relatively small amount of government contributions.

Other national public television program distributors include American Public Television and NETA. Distributors of radio programs include American Public Media, Pacifica Radio, Public Radio International, and Public Radio Exchange.

Public broadcasting in the United States also includes Community radio and College radio stations, which may offer local news programming.

Private-sector news media

Fox Corporation

The Fox Broadcasting Company, television and cable networks such as Fox, Fox News Channel, Fox Business Network, Fox Sports, and 27 local television stations.

News Corp
Holdings include: the Wall Street Journal, the New York Post, Barron's, book publisher HarperCollins and numerous websites including MarketWatch.

Warner Bros. Discovery
Holdings include: CNN, the CW (a joint venture with Paramount Global), HBO, Cinemax, Cartoon Network, TBS, TNT, Warner Bros. Pictures, Castle Rock Entertainment and New Line Cinema.

Paramount Global
Holdings include: MTV, Nickelodeon, VH1, BET, Comedy Central, Paramount Pictures, CBS, Showtime, Paramount Home Entertainment Viacom 18 is a joint venture with the Indian media company Global Broadcast news.

The Walt Disney Company
Holdings include: ABC Television Network, cable networks including ESPN, the Disney Channel, A&E, Lifetime, National Geographic Channel, FX, 227 radio stations, music and book publishing companies, production companies Touchstone, 20th Century Studios, Searchlight Pictures, Blue Sky Studios, Walt Disney Pictures, Pixar Animation Studios, and the cellular service Disney Mobile.

Comcast NBCUniversal
Holdings include: NBC, Telemundo, cable networks including USA Network, CNBC and MSNBC, along with 11 NBC-owned and operated stations.

Major news sources

{| class="wikitable sortable"
|-
! Name
! Means of distribution
! Main media type(s)
! Founded/launched 
|-
| ABC News
| Television,online
|News
| 1945
|-

| CBS News
| Television, magazines, and radio
|News
| 1927
|-
| CNN
| Television, online
| News, Politics
| 1980
|-
| Fox News Channel
| Television, online
| News, Politics
| 1996
|-
| MSNBC
| Television,online
| News, Politics
| 1996
|-
| NBC News
| Television, online
|News
| 1940
|-
| The New York Times
| Newspapers, online
| News, sports
| 1851
|-
| USA Today
| Newspapers, online
| News
| 1982
|-
| The Wall Street Journal
| Newspapers, online
| News
| 1889
|-
| The Washington Post
| Newspapers, online
| News
| 1877
|-
| POLITICO
| Online
| News, Politics
| 2007
|-
| Bloomberg
| Online
| World news
| 1981
|-
| Vice News
| Online
| News
| 2013
|-
| HBO
| Online, television
| Entertainment
| 1972
|-
| HuffPost
| Online
| News
| 2005
|-
| TMZ
| Online
| Celebrity news
| 2005
|-
| CNET
| Online
| Tech news
| 1994
|-
| NPR
| Radio, online
| News
| 1970
|-
| The Hollywood Reporter
| Magazines, online 
| Hollywood film
| 1930
|-
| Newsweek
| Magazines, online
| News
| 1933
|-
| The New Yorker
| Magazines, online
|News
| 1925
|-
| Time| Magazines, online
| News
| 1923
|-
| U.S. News & World Report| Magazines, online
| News
| 1948
|}

Agenda-setting
An important role which is often ascribed to the media is that of agenda-setter. Georgetown University professor Gary Wasserman describes this as "putting together an agenda of national priorities — what should be taken seriously, what lightly, what not at all". Wasserman calls this "the most important political function the media perform". Agenda-setting theory was proposed by McCombs and Shaw in the 1970s and suggests that the public agenda is dictated by the media agenda.

Agenda-setting in domestic politics
In a commercialized media context, the media can often not afford to ignore an important issue which another television station, newspaper, or radio station is willing to pick up. The news media may be able to create new issues by reporting or they can obscure issues through negligence and distraction. For example, if neighborhoods are affected by high crime rates, or unemployment, journalists may not spend sufficient time reporting on potential solutions, or on systemic causes such as corruption and social exclusion, or on other related issues. They can reduce the direct awareness of the public of these problems. In some cases, the public can choose another news source, so it is in a news organization's commercial interest to try to find an agenda which corresponds as closely as possible to peoples' desires. They may not be entirely successful, but the agenda-setting potential of the media is considerably limited by the competition for viewers' interest, readers and listeners.

Different US news media sources tend to identify the same major stories in domestic politics, which may imply that the media are prioritizing issues according to a shared set of criteria.

Agenda-setting in foreign policy
One way in which the media could set the agenda is if it is in an area in which very few Americans have direct experience of the issues. This applies to foreign policy. When American military personnel are involved, the media needs to report because the personnel are related to the American public. The media is also likely to have an interest in reporting issues with major direct effects on American workers, such as major trade agreements with Mexico. In other cases, it is difficult to see how the media can be prevented from setting the foreign policy agenda.

McKay lists as one of the three main distortions of information by the media "Placing high priority on American news to the detriment of foreign news. And when the US is engaged in military action abroad, this 'foreign news' crowds out other foreign news".

Horse race approach to political campaign coverage

American news media are more obsessed than ever with the horse-race aspects of the presidential campaign, according to a new study. Coverage of the political campaigns have been less reflective on the issues that matter to voters, and instead have primarily focused on campaign tactics and strategy, according to a report conducted jointly by the Project for Excellence in Journalism, part of the Pew Research Center, and the Joan Shorenstein Center on the Press, Politics and Public Policy at the Kennedy School of Harvard University, which examined 1,742 stories that appeared from January through May 2007 in 48 news outlets. Almost two-thirds of all stories in US news media, including print, television, radio and online, focused on the political aspects of the campaign, while only one percent focused on the candidates' public records. Only 12 percent of stories seemed relevant to voters' decision-making; the rest were more about tactics and strategy.

The proportion of horse-race stories has gotten worse over time. Horse-race coverage has accounted for 63 percent of reports this year (2007) compared with what the study said was about 55 percent in 2000 and 2004. "If American politics is changing," the study concluded, "the style and approach of the American press do not appear to be changing with it".

The study found that the US news media deprive the American public of what Americans say they want: voters are eager to know more about the candidates' positions on issues and their personal backgrounds, more about lesser-known candidates and more about debates. Commentators have pointed out that when covering election campaigns news media often emphasize trivial facts about the candidates but more rarely provide the candidates' specific public stances on issues that matter to voters.

The same approach can also apply to issue politics. Kathleen Hall Jamieson, director of the Annenberg Public Policy Center coined the term "tactical framing" to describe news coverage that focuses on the question of how a policy proposal will affect the next election, rather than whether or not it is a good idea. Jamieson cites coverage of the Green New Deal as an example. Research by Jameson has found the presence of tactically framed stories can make voters more cynical and less likely to remember substantive information.

See also
 Media bias in the United States
 Media of the United States
 Weather media in the United States

References

Further reading
 
 Kurtz, Howard (1993). Media Circus: The Trouble with America's Newspapers'', Times Books, Random House.

External links

 Chart – Real and Fake News (2016)/Vanessa Otero (basis) (Mark Frauenfelder)
 Chart – Real and Fake News (2014) (2016)/Pew Research Center

 
Mass media in the United States